Gloiocephala lutea is a species of fungus native to Ecuador.  It was described as new to science by Rolf Singer in 1976.

References

Physalacriaceae
Fungi described in 1976
Fungi of Ecuador
Taxa named by Rolf Singer